The Transporters is a 2006 children's television series produced by Catalyst Pictures Limited designed to help children with autism aged between 2 and 8 years old recognise and understand emotions.

It was developed by the Autism Research Centre at the University of Cambridge by a team led by Professor Simon Baron-Cohen and including Dr Ofer Golan.

The Transporters is based on the idea that children with autism may find human faces confusing, because they are unpredictable, because the autistic brain cannot cope with unpredictability. In Baron-Cohen's theory, children with autism are strong "systemisers" and faces are hard to systemize. In contrast, children with autism have a preference for predictable systems. The Transporters therefore focuses on mechanical vehicles that only travel along tracks, because they are highly predictable systems. Grafted onto these animated vehicles are real human faces. In this way, social skills teaching takes place in an autism friendly format.

Evaluation 
A study published in the Journal of Autism and Developmental Disorders found that after watching the DVD for 15 minutes a day for four weeks most children with ASC (autistic spectrum condition) caught up with typically developing children in their ability to recognise emotions on four different tasks.

The series 
The Transporters DVD release(s) consists of fifteen five-minute episodes, each featuring a key emotion. There are also thirty interactive quizzes and an accompanying booklet to reinforce learning. In 2007, the series was nominated for a BAFTA award.

The series features eight animated toy vehicles owned by a boy called Jamie. Each has an actual human face so that viewers learn to recognise real rather than cartoon expressions.  All the expressions were verified by an independent panel before they were included in the series.

There are two versions of the DVD, with different accents and vocabulary. The North American version is voiced by Kerry Shale and the British English version is voiced by Stephen Fry.

The Transporters was originally commissioned by Culture Online, which was part of the UK government’s Department for Culture, Media and Sport.

Characters 
 Barney the Tractor
 Charlie the Tram
 Dan the Cable Car
 Jennie the Tram
 Nigel the Bus
 Oliver the Funicular
 Sally the Cable Car
 William the Ferry

Episodes with key emotions 

"The Transporters' Happy Day"
"Sally's Sad Day"
"Nigel's Slow Day"
"Charlie Saves the Day"
"A Very Exciting Day"
"Jennie's Smelly Adventure"
"Barney's Special Day"
"William's Scrapyard Nightmare"
"Charlie's Missed School Run"
"Oliver the Kind Funicular"
"Slow Down, Nigel!"
"The Great Race"
"Why Can't I Be Somebody Else?"
"Playing Around"
"Jennie's Difficult Day"

Voice cast 

 Stephen Fry as the Narrator (UK)
 Kerry Shale as the Narrator (USA)

See also 
The Space Place
Normal People Scare Me

References 

Autism in television
British computer-animated television series
Films about autism
Social guidance films